Dámaso is a Spanish masculine given name. The name is equivalent to that of Pope Damasus I in English. The name also exists in Italian as Damaso, though it is uncommon.

People

 Dámaso Alonso (1898–1990), Spanish poet
 Dámaso Berenguer, 1st Count of Xauen (1873–1953), Spanish soldier and politician
 Dámaso Blanco (born 1941), Venezuelan baseball third baseman
 Dámaso Centeno (1850–1892), Argentine politician and orphanage founder 
 Dámaso Espino (born 1983), Panamanian baseball catcher
 Dámaso García (1957–2020), Dominican baseball player
 Dámaso González (1948–2017), Spanish bullfighter
 Dámaso Antonio Larrañaga (1771–1848), Uruguayan priest, naturalist and botanist
 Dámaso Marte (born 1975), Dominican Major League Baseball relief pitcher
 Dámaso Pérez Prado (1916–1989), Cuban musician
 Dámaso Rodríguez Martín "El Brujo" (1945–1991), Spanish serial killer
 Dámaso Ruiz-Jarabo Colomer (1949–2009), Spanish jurist
 Dámaso de Toro, Mayor of Ponce, Puerto Rico in 1701
 Father Dámaso, a character in José Rizal's novel Noli Me Tangere

Other
 San Lorenzo in Damaso, a basilica in Rome
 Instituto Social Militar Dr. Dámaso Centeno, a charity school in Buenos Aires
 Mariano Dámaso Beraun District, one of six districts within the Peruvian province of Leoncio Prado
 Universidad Católica del Uruguay Dámaso Antonio Larrañaga, a Jesuit university in Montevideo

Spanish masculine given names